The Antique Store is a historic commercial building in Plantersville, Dallas County, Alabama.  It is the oldest surviving commercial building in the community.  The one-story, wood-frame structure was built in 1870.  The main facade is three bays wide, with a pedimented one-story porch spanning the entire width.  A side ell, added after the initial construction, projects from the south side of the main block.  It was added to the National Register of Historic Places on January 29, 1987, as a part of the Plantersville Multiple Resource Area.

References

National Register of Historic Places in Dallas County, Alabama
Commercial buildings on the National Register of Historic Places in Alabama
Commercial buildings completed in 1870